Warren Houala (born 26 June 1997) is a New Caledonian footballer who plays as a forward for New Caledonian club Hienghène Sport and the New Caledonian national team.

Club career
Houala started his career in the youth of Hienghène Sport. In 2015, he moved to the first team and made his debut

National team
In 2017 Houala was called up for the New Caledonia national football team. He made his debut on November 26, 2017, in a 1–1 draw against Estonia. He played the match from the start and was subbed after 85 minutes for Glen Wayaridri who also made his debut.

International goals
Scores and results list New Caledonia's goal tally first.

References

New Caledonian footballers
Association football forwards
New Caledonia international footballers
Living people
1997 births
Hienghène Sport players